Domingo Broto Regalés (28 July 1903 - 16 March 1960) was a Spanish footballer who played as a inside right.

Club career
Born in Catalonia, he joined the first team of Terrassa FC during the 1922-23 season. In Terrassa, he stood out as an extraordinary goal scorer, which earned him a move to Espanyol in April 1928, along with Crisant Bosch and Julio Káiser. He played a pivotal role in helping the club win the 1928-29 Catalonia championship and reach the 1929 Copa del Rey Final, which Espanyol won after a 2-1 win over Real Madrid. The following season, under Jack Greenwell, he lost prominence in favor of Ricardo Gallart.

International career
Being a Terrassa FC player, he was eligible to play for the Catalonia national team, earning several caps between 1926 and 1929, in which he scored 5 goals, all of which in 1926, netting in a 4-0 win over a Paris XI on 16 May, a brace in a 5-2 win over a Zürich XI on 11 July, but most importantly, Broto scored both goals of a 2-0 win over Asturias in the first leg of the 1926 Prince of Asturias Cup Final, which was an inter-regional competition organized by the RFEF. A 4-3 win in the second leg meant a record-breaking third Prince of Asturias Cup title for Catalonia.

Honours

Club
Espanyol
Copa del Rey:
Champions (1): 1929

International
Catalonia
Prince of Asturias Cup:
Champions (1): 1926

References

1903 births
1960 deaths
Footballers from Terrassa
Spanish footballers
Association football midfielders
Terrassa FC footballers
RCD Espanyol footballers
CD Castellón footballers
La Liga players
Catalonia international footballers